Danny Ray Brouillette ( born August 18, 1962) is an American government official and businessman who served as the United States Secretary of Energy from 2019 to 2021. He previously served as the Deputy Secretary of Energy from August 2017 to December 2019.

Early life and education
Brouillette is originally from Paincourtville, Louisiana. He graduated from the University of Maryland, College Park in 1995.

Career 
Following his service in the United States Army, Brouillette served as Rep. Billy Tauzin's legislative director from 1989 to 1997. From 1997 to 2000, he was Senior Vice President of R. Duffy Wall & Associates, a DC-based independent lobbying firm. Brouillette was Assistant Secretary for Congressional and Intergovernmental Affairs in the U.S. Department of Energy from 2001 to 2003 under President George W. Bush.

He then served as chief of staff under Rep. Billy Tauzin and was also staff director for the House Energy and Commerce Committee from 2003 to 2004, when Tauzin chaired the committee. Brouillette was involved in crafting provisions included in the Energy Policy Act of 2005, specifically with respect to the Department of Energy loan guarantee program and federal authorization of importation and exportation of liquid natural gas.

From 2004 to 2006, Brouillette was a vice president at Ford Motor Company, running the company's domestic policy teams. He also served on Ford's North American Operating Committee. In 2006, Brouillette was hired as head of public policy and senior vice president at United Services Automobile Association, which offers financial services to people and families that serve, or served, in the United States military.

Brouillette also served as a member of Louisiana's State Mineral and Energy Board from 2013 to 2016.

Dan Brouillette was awarded the 2020 Distinguished Alumnus Award by the University of Maryland Global Campus Alumni Association. In 2021, he joined the American Council for Capital Formation's board of advisors.

Deputy Secretary of Energy (2017–2019)
On April 3, 2017, President Donald Trump announced he would nominate Brouillette as United States Deputy Secretary of Energy in the United States Department of Energy. Brouillette was confirmed by the U.S. Senate on August 3, 2017. He was sworn in as the Deputy Secretary for Energy on August 8, 2017.

Secretary of Energy (2019–2021)

On October 18, 2019, President Trump announced he would nominate Brouillette as United States Secretary of Energy to replace Rick Perry, who had announced he would step down by the end of the year. On November 7, 2019, President Trump sent his nomination to the Senate.

Perry formally resigned as Energy Secretary on December 1, 2019, making Brouillette the acting secretary as his nomination was still pending before the U.S. Senate. On December 2, 2019, the Senate confirmed his nomination by a vote of 70–15. Brouillette was formally sworn in on December 11, 2019.

Brouillette delegated the powers and responsibilities of Deputy Secretary to then-Under Secretary of Energy Mark Menezes. Menezes serving as Acting Deputy Secretary of Energy was confirmed as Deputy Secretary on August 4, 2020.

Brouillette traveled extensively, both domestically and internationally, during his year as Secretary. In February 2020, he traveled to Munich, Germany to attend the Munich Security Conference; Vienna, Austria, to attend the IAEA's International Conference on Nuclear Security; Lisbon, Portugal, to tour the Port of Sines and meet with various officials and industry representatives; Rio de Janeiro to attend the U.S.-Brazil Energy Forum; and New Delhi to attend the U.S.-India Energy Cooperation Roundtable. Brouillette also traveled frequently within the United States in 2020, including to Pennsylvania, North Carolina, Virginia, Wisconsin, Michigan, Montana, Louisiana, North Dakota, Colorado, Texas, and Kentucky. On January 7, 2021, Brouillette promised a seamless handover between the Trump and Biden administrations.

On January 15, 2021, Brouillette issued a letter to the US Governors in which he highlighted the need of critical energy workers' health and preferential Covid vaccination, to ensure an uninterrupted energy supply to the Nation's communities.

Personal life
Brouillette and his wife, Adrienne, are U.S. Army veterans and the parents of nine children, all of whom the couple homeschooled. They reside in San Antonio. He served in the Army from 1982 to 1987 as a tank commander in Germany in the "Fulda Gap" and as a Drill Sergeant in the Army Reserve in South Carolina.

References

External links

|-

|-

1962 births
Living people
21st-century American businesspeople
American lobbyists
Ford executives
People from Assumption Parish, Louisiana
Businesspeople from San Antonio
Political chiefs of staff
Texas Republicans
Trump administration cabinet members
United States Army non-commissioned officers
United States Army reservists
United States Deputy Secretaries of Energy
United States Secretaries of Energy
United States congressional aides
University of Maryland, College Park alumni
Washington, D.C., Republicans